The Anderson Building is a historic building located at 701 South 24th Street in Omaha, Nebraska, United States. It is a Sullivanesque style building erected in 1924.

History 
The building was listed on the U.S. National Register of Historic Places on November 20, 2009. It "stands as a textbook example of the Sullivanesque design principals as promoted by the Midland Terra Cotta Company."

The listing was announced as the featured listing in the National Park Service's weekly list of November 27, 2009.

The building meets criteria assessed in the MPD study titled "Apartments, Flats and Tenements in Omaha, Nebraska from 1880-1962".

References

External links

Buildings and structures in Omaha, Nebraska
Residential buildings on the National Register of Historic Places in Nebraska
National Register of Historic Places in Omaha, Nebraska
Buildings and structures completed in 1924